The 1977 UK Athletics Championships was the national championship in outdoor track and field for the United Kingdom held at Cwmbran Stadium, Cwmbran.

It was the first edition of the competition limited to British athletes only, launched as an alternative to the AAA Championships, which was open to foreign competitors. However, due to the fact that the calibre of national competition remained greater at the AAA event, the UK Championships this year were not considered the principal national championship event by some statisticians, such as the National Union of Track Statisticians (NUTS). Many of the athletes below also competed at the 1977 AAA Championships.

Ainsley Bennett and Sonia Lannaman won sprint doubles in the 100 metres and 200 metres in the men's and women's side, respectively. Sharon Colyear took the women's titles in 100 metres hurdles and long jump. Other athletes who performed well in multiple events were Andrea Lynch (double sprint runner-up), Allan Wells (100 m runner-up and 200 m third-placer), and Tessa Sanderson who won the javelin throw as well as placing top three in the 400 metres hurdles.

The main international track and field competition for the United Kingdom that year was the 1977 European Cup. Distance runners Steve Ovett and Nick Rose won both the UK event and the European Cup title. Sanderson, Lannaman, Bennett were minor medallists there, as were women's 400 metres champion Donna Hartley and men's long jump runner-up Roy Mitchell.

Medal summary

Men

Women

References

UK Athletics Championships
UK Outdoor Championships
Athletics Outdoor
Sport in Monmouthshire
Athletics competitions in Wales